Gisèle Lullaby is the stage name of Simon Gosselin (born August 8, 1988), a French Canadian drag performer most known for winning the third season of Canada's Drag Race.

Career 
Originally from Boucherville, Quebec, Gosselin began as a backup dancer for drag queens at Cabaret Mado, but did not perform in drag himself until a 2009 birthday party for Montreal nightlife personality Franky Dee, when he was convinced to do drag and perform to Beyoncé's "Single Ladies". She has been a longtime host of her own Tuesday night show, Full Gisèle, at Cabaret Mado.

In 2020, Gisèle Lullaby participated in Saint-Jeanne, an LGBTQ-inclusive Saint-Jean-Baptiste Day livestream coordinated by singer-songwriter Safia Nolin.

Gisèle Lullaby competed on the third season of Canada's Drag Race. She impersonated Marie Curie for the Snatch Game challenge, receiving praise for her black comedy routine about Curie suffering increasing effects of radiation sickness, pulling from a historical figure not traditionally seen as a source of comedy. She was named the winner of the season in the finale.

On September 18, 2022, Gisèle Lullaby presented an award at the Prix Gémeaux ceremony alongside Rita Baga, Barbada de Barbades and Mona de Grenoble.

In 2022, she joined the record label So Fierce Music and partnered up with music producer Velvet Code to create the song Je Ne Sais Quoi.

Personal life 
Gosselin is from Boucherville, but is now living in Montreal, Quebec. Before deciding to make drag her career, Gisèle wanted to do theater.

Filmography

Television

Web series

References

Living people
Canada's Drag Race winners
Canadian drag queens
French Quebecers
People from Montreal
People from Boucherville
1988 births
21st-century Canadian LGBT people